From June 12 to June 13, 2013, two derechos occurred across different areas of the Eastern United States. The initial derecho formed on the afternoon of June 12 and tracked across a large section of the Midwestern United States, the central Appalachians, and the Mid-Atlantic states before moving into the Atlantic Ocean during the morning of June 13. A second, more widespread and intense derecho occurred on June 13 across the Southeastern United States, resulting in major wind damage across North Carolina, Virginia, and Maryland, among other states. These storms caused at least three deaths and extensive damage property damage – resulting from both tornadoes and straight-line winds – from Iowa to South Carolina. 28 tornadoes touched down in Iowa, Illinois, Ohio, Georgia, North Carolina, Maryland, Virginia, and Tennessee. One of the tornadoes in Iowa was rated as a high-end EF3, destroying a restaurant and two houses. One person was injured by another tornado, rated EF2, in Carroll County, Illinois, and nine people were injured by an EF1 in Cherokee County, Georgia.

Storm overview
An upper level disturbance across the northern Great Plains interacted with a warm and moist air mass on the afternoon of June 12. This interaction led to the development of supercell thunderstorms across Iowa, Illinois, Wisconsin, and Minnesota. The cells gradually formed into a squall line and turned into a derecho in the Chicago area that evening.

June 12 supercells
Between 3 and 4 p.m. CDT (2000–2100 UTC) on June 12, numerous supercell thunderstorms developed across Iowa, Illinois, Wisconsin, and Minnesota. These supercells resulted in seven of the 13 tornadoes that touched down that day. Five tornadoes were confirmed across Wright and Franklin counties in Iowa. One of the tornadoes was rated high-end EF3, destroying two houses and a restaurant. Other tornadoes were rated EF2, EF1, and EF0, with numerous farm buildings suffering major damage. Two other tornadoes – rated EF0 and EF2 – touched down in Jo Daviess and Carroll County, Illinois. One person was injured near Savanna.

June 12–13 derecho
The supercell activity in Iowa and Illinois congealed into a powerful squall line as the storms moved into Indiana later that night. The newly formed derecho began producing numerous reports of damaging winds in northern Indiana. Farm structures were destroyed and trees were snapped and uprooted. The derecho continued into Ohio and produced widespread damaging winds across much of the state, along with several embedded tornadoes. Henry County, Ohio documented four separate touchdowns, and a total of nine tornadoes occurred in Ohio that night.

The derecho continued eastward into the early morning hours of the 13th, through Pennsylvania, Virginia, West Virginia, Maryland, New Jersey, and Delaware, producing wind damage in each state before dissipating.

June 13 derecho
On the morning of the 13, another linear complex of severe storms developed along a line near the southern border of Ohio. The storms eventually strengthened into a powerful derecho and raced to the south and east. As the storms reached eastern Tennessee and Kentucky, hundreds of damaging wind reports began coming into the Storm Prediction Center. In the Atlanta area, the storms produced two embedded EF1 tornadoes that moved through several suburbs. One of the tornadoes struck Canton, Georgia and injured nine people. Fatalities and injuries occurred as a result of falling trees and power lines as the storms ripped through North Carolina and Virginia, along with numerous reports of damaging winds and power outages.

In Maryland, the derecho produced an unusually fast moving, long track EF0 tornado that tracked through several northern DC suburbs, downing many trees, several of which landed on homes. Emdedded tornadoes also occurred in Tennessee, Virginia, and North Carolina. The derecho moved out over the Atlantic Ocean and dissipated later that evening. The SPC received a total of 794 damaging wind reports that day.

Confirmed tornadoes

June 12 event

June 13 event

See also
June 2012 North American derecho
Derecho

References

Derechos in the United States
Tornadoes of 2013
2013 in Minnesota
2013 in Iowa
2013 in Illinois
2013 in Michigan
2013 in Wisconsin
2013 in Indiana
2013 in Ohio
2013 in Kentucky
2013 in West Virginia
2013 in Pennsylvania
2013 in Virginia
2013 in Maryland
2013 in North Carolina
2013 in Washington, D.C.
2013 in Delaware
2013 in New Jersey
2013 in Tennessee
2013 in Georgia (U.S. state)
2013 in South Carolina
2013 in Alabama
2013 in Mississippi
2013 meteorology
2013 natural disasters in the United States
June 2013 events in the United States